Callionima acuta is a species of moth in the family Sphingidae. It was originally described by Walter Rothschild and Karl Jordan as Hemeroplanes acuta, in 1910.

Distribution 
Is known from Peru and Bolivia.

Description 
Males have a wingspan of about 32 millimetres. The species is similar to Callionima parce, but is darker in colour. The forewing upperside ground colour is blackish-brown. The hindwing underside has a median line and a line of dots in the outer half.

Biology 
Adults are probably on wing in multiple generations.

References

a
Sphingidae of South America
Taxa named by Walter Rothschild
Moths described in 1910